Donald Ezra Jarmon (April 30, 1914 – June 30, 1952) was an American former Negro league pitcher who played in the 1930s.

A native of Kinston, North Carolina, Jarmon played for the Columbus Blue Birds in 1933.

In four recorded appearances on the mound, he posted an 11.37 ERA over 12.2 innings.

References

External links
 and Seamheads

1914 births
1952 deaths
Place of death missing
Columbus Blue Birds players